Analyta is a genus of moths of the family Crambidae.

Species
Analyta apicalis Hampson, 1896
Analyta albicillalis Lederer, 1863
Analyta beaulaincourti Rougeot, 1977
Analyta calligrammalis Mabille, 1879
Analyta gammalis Viette, 1958
Analyta heranicealis (Walker, 1859)
Analyta nigriflavalis Hampson, 1913
Analyta pervinca Ghesquière, 1942
Analyta semantris Dyar, 1914
Analyta vansomereni Tams, 1932

Former species
Analyta aldabralis (Viette, 1958)

References

Spilomelinae
Crambidae genera
Taxa named by Julius Lederer